Olga Sergeyevna Li (born 22 July 1986) is a Russian politician and journalist. Since 2011, she has been a representative in the Kursk regional legislative.

She prepares to run for parliament as a member of the opposition. However, Russian authorities try to charge her with "degrading the dignity" of state officials and endangering Russia's statehood, after she has criticized the Russian president Vladimir Putin in her video named "An Appeal to Putin". Among others, Li accuses him of allowing "criminal conspiracy" at the top of Russian government or the "destruction of the rule of law". If she is convicted, she could face up to two years in prison.

Li has also criticized some of the local authorities, including the deputy chairman of the regional assembly, Viktor Karamyshev, from Putin's United Russia party.

She is a single mother of two daughters.

References 

1986 births
21st-century Russian women politicians
Living people
People from Karaganda Region
Koryo-saram
Russian activists against the 2022 Russian invasion of Ukraine
Russian journalists
Russian people of Korean descent
Russian people of Kazakhstani descent
Yabloko politicians